Waldheim is a town of 1,035 residents in the rural municipality of Laird No. 404, in the Canadian province of Saskatchewan, located 57 km north of Saskatoon. Waldheim is located on Highway 312 in central Saskatchewan, the "Heart of the Old North-West". Fort Carlton, Batoche, Battle of Fish Creek, and Seager Wheeler's Maple Grove Farm are all near Waldheim.

History
Mennonites from Manitoba and South Dakota arrived here to settle and farm in 1893. The Canadian Northern Railway arrived in 1908.

Particularly in the 1870s, Mennonites of Dutch-German origins residing in colonies in the Black Sea region of present-day Ukraine became alarmed at the rising nationalism in the Russian Empire. Along with land shortages in these growing colonies, pressure toward Russification of minorities was threatening Mennonite values in education. Similarly, the promise made by Catherine the Great to exempt them from military service was quite clearly being challenged and rewritten by the then current Russian government. Canada was seeking farming immigrants, and about 7,000 Mennonites chose to immigrate to Manitoba where the government of Canada set aside two reserves for their resettlement. In the early 1890s, some of these families decided to move on to District of Saskatchewan, thereby establishing a trend that would see considerable Mennonite immigration to the Saskatchewan Valley area before the turn of the century. Many came from Manitoba, but others arrived directly from colonies in Russia, from the Danzig region of Prussia and from Kansas, Nebraska, and Minnesota where they had settled in the 1870s.

Thriving Mennonite farming communities were quickly established in the Saskatchewan Valley area in the vicinities of Aberdeen, Laird, Waldheim, Langham, Dalmeny, and Rosthern particularly. Churches were established, land was broken and cropped and roads were built.

Demographics 

Sports
Fort Carlton Hockey League serves a large area in the vicinity of Waldheim, such as Rosthern, Warman, Dalmeny, Shellbrook, Bruno, Martensville, Aberdeen, Blaine Lake, and Cudworth.  Sask Valley Minor Hockey League offers level of hockey for Novice, Atoms, Pee Wee, Bantams and Midget.

Recreation
Waldheim features a green space in its downtown area: Sam Wendland Heritage Park. This park was created in 2000, and was dedicated to Sam Wendland for his many years of serving as mayor. The Waldheim Pineridge Golf and Country Club is a neighbour to the recreational facility built in 1976 (containing an arena and a curling rink). Westview Jubilee Seniors Centre offers events and services to Waldheim's senior population.

Attractions
Valley Regional Park offers a 9-hole grass green golf course as well as camping facilities.
Valley - Waldheim regional park
Valley - Rosthern regional park
Martins Lake regional park

Provincial parks in the area of Waldheim are:
Fort Carlton
Batoche
Battle of Fish Creek
Seager Wheeler's Maple Grove Farm

Camps and retreats near Waldheim are:
Shekinah Retreat Centre
Redberry Bible Camp
Camp Kadesh

Notable people
Kelly Block, politician
Jennifer Bowes, politician
Howard Dirks, politician
Dustin Friesen, hockey player
Ben Heppner (politician), politician
Henry Feyerabend, evangelist
Dave Schultz (ice hockey), hockey player

See also
List of communities in Saskatchewan
Eigenheim Mennonite Church
Census Division No. 15, Saskatchewan

References

External links

Mennonitism in Saskatchewan
Towns in Saskatchewan
Laird No. 404, Saskatchewan
Russian Mennonite diaspora in Canada